Hagan may refer to:


Places

Iran
 Hagan, Iran, a village in Hamadan Province

Norway
 Hagan, a village in Harstad
 Hagan, a village in Akershus

United States
 Hagan, Georgia, a city
 Hagan, Minnesota, an unincorporated community
 Hagan, New Mexico, a ghost town
 Hagan, Virginia, an unincorporated community
 Hagan Mountain, Washington state

People
 Hagan (surname)
 Hagan (given name)

Sports facilities
 Hagan Arena, Philadelphia, Pennsylvania, United States, the basketball arena of St. Joseph's University
 Hagan Park, Coagh, Northern Ireland, home of football club Coagh United

See also
Hagen (disambiguation)
O'Hagan, an Irish surname